Balungao, officially the Municipality of Balungao, is a 4th class municipality in the province of Pangasinan, Philippines. According to the 2020 census, it has a population of 30,004 people.

The town is located in the south-eastern part of the province bordering the province of Nueva Ecija to the south.

History

Early settlers
The town of Balungao were first inhabited by nomadic people from the Ilocos region who found their way to the area through San Fabian, Pangasinan.  They were farmers looking for places to settle down, engaging in agriculture to survive.  Its origin is evident in the fact that Balungao is one of the Ilocano-speaking towns in the province where the primary language is the Pangasinense.

Foundation
Balungao was originally called Panaclaban and was a part of Cuyapo town in the adjacent province of Nueva Ecija till the latter part of 18th century.  It was annexed to the town of Rosales, Pangasinan in the early part of 19th century because of its geographic location. It officially became an independent municipality in 1815.

On April 25, 1993, Balungao Mayor Jose C. Peralta was assassinated  while he was attending Mass with his family at the local church.

Geography

Barangays
Balungao is politically subdivided into 20 barangays. These barangays are headed by elected officials: Barangay Captain, Barangay Council, whose members are called Barangay Councilors. All are elected every three years.

Angayan Norte
Angayan Sur
Capulaan
Esmeralda
Kita-kita
Mabini
Mauban
Poblacion
Pugaro
Rajal
San Andres
San Aurelio 1st
San Aurelio 2nd
San Aurelio 3rd
San Joaquin
San Julian
San Leon
San Marcelino
San Miguel
San Raymundo

Climate

Demographics

Economy

Government
Balungao, belonging to the sixth congressional district of the province of Pangasinan, is governed by a mayor designated as its local chief executive and by a municipal council as its legislative body in accordance with the Local Government Code. The mayor, vice mayor, and the councilors are elected directly by the people through an election which is being held every three years.

Elected officials

Tourism

Mount Balungao
Mount Balungao is an extinct volcano,  ASL located in the municipality of Balungao.  Its volcanic past is manifested by its physical profile and the presence of hot and cold springs.  The Philippine Institute of Volcanology and Seismology (PHIVOLCS) lists Mount Balungao as an inactive volcano.

Balungao Hilltop Adventure
Balungao opened its doors to adventure travel tourism with the opening of Balungao Hilltop Adventure on September 8, 2011. The Balungao Hilltop Adventure also offers ATV or quad bike adventure, bungee trampoline, biking, mountain climbing, and the refurbished hot and cold spring swimming pools.

It originally started as the Mt. Balungao Hot and Cold Springs Resort under the administration of then Mayor Jose G. Peralta Jr. It was not until 2011, under the administration of the Mayor Philipp G. Peralta, that it was repackaged for adventure travelers.

Longest zipline in Pangasinan
Balungao Hilltop Adventure offers a Zip Line with a length  which could last from 15 seconds to a minute depending on your weight and your position when you are suspended at the Zip Line. It begins from a Hill, overlooking the valley passing through another hill down to the Balungao Hot and Cold Spring Resort. It is considered as the longest Zip line in Pangasinan

Education
San Aurelio National High School
Rajal-Angayan National High School
Balungao National High School
Balungao Central High School
Remnant International School
San Leon National High School

See also
List of inactive volcanoes in the Philippines

References

External links

Balungao Profile at PhilAtlas.com
Municipal Profile at the National Competitiveness Council of the Philippines
Balungao Pangasinan Official Website
Balungao at the Pangasinan Government Website
Local Governance Performance Management System
[ Philippine Standard Geographic Code]
Philippine Census Information

Municipalities of Pangasinan